Dang is one of the 182 Legislative Assembly constituencies of Gujarat state in India. It is part of Dang district and is reserved for candidates belonging to the Scheduled Tribes.

List of segments
This assembly seat represents the following segments,

 Dang District entirely (Waghai, Ahwa and Subir Taluka)

Members of Legislative Assembly
2007 - Vijaybhai Rameshbhai Patel, Bharatiya Janata Party
2012 - Mangalbhai Gavit, Indian National Congress
2017 - Mangalbhai Gavit, Indian National Congress

Election candidate

2022 
  

-->

Election results

2020 by-poll

2017

2012

See also
 Gujarat Legislative Assembly
 List of constituencies of the Gujarat Legislative Assembly
 Dang district

References

External links
 

Assembly constituencies of Gujarat
Dang district, India